Ellis Hicks (10 October 1934 – 7 June 1961) was an  Australian rules footballer who played with South Melbourne in the Victorian Football League (VFL).

Notes

External links 

1934 births
1961 deaths
Australian rules footballers from Victoria (Australia)
Sydney Swans players
People educated at Wesley College (Victoria)